Michael or Mike Schwartz may refer to:

Mix Master Mike (Michael Schwartz, born 1970), American turntablist
Michael Schwartz (sociologist) (born 1942), American sociologist
Mike Schwartz (fl. 2001–2007), American actor and writer
Michael Schwartz (physician) (born 1961), American physician
Michael Schwartz (educational administrator) (born 1937), American academic administrator
Mike Schwartz (activist) (1950–2013), American anti-abortion activist
Michael Warren Schwartz (fl. 1996–2012), professor of medicine
Michal Schwartz (born 1950), Israeli professor of neuroimmunology
Mike Schwartz (basketball) (born 1949), American-Israeli basketball player
Michael A. Schwartz, American academic and psychiatrist

See also
Michael Schwarz (disambiguation)